In the United States, the minimum wage is set by U.S. labor law and a range of state and local laws. The first federal minimum wage was instituted in the National Industrial Recovery Act of 1933, signed into law by President Franklin D. Roosevelt, but later found to be unconstitutional.  In 1938, the Fair Labor Standards Act established it at $0.25 an hour ($ in  dollars). Its purchasing power peaked in 1968, at $1.60 ($ in  dollars). Since 2009, it has been $7.25 per hour.

Employers have to pay workers the highest minimum wage of those prescribed by federal, state, and local laws. In January 2020, 29 states and the District of Columbia had minimum wages higher than the federal minimum, so that almost 90% of Americans earning just minimum wage got more than $7.25 an hour. The effective nationwide minimum wage (the wage that the average minimum-wage worker earns) was $11.80 in May 2019; this was the highest it had been since at least 1994, the earliest year for which effective-minimum-wage data are available.

In 2021, the Congressional Budget Office estimated that incrementally raising the federal minimum wage to $15 an hour by 2025 would benefit 17 million workers and would also reduce employment by 1.4 million people. It would also lift about 900,000 people out of poverty and might raise wages for 10 million more workers, cause prices to rise and overall economic output to decrease slightly, and increase the federal budget deficit by $54 billion over the next 10 years.  An Ipsos survey in August 2020 found that support for a rise in the federal minimum wage had grown substantially during the COVID-19 pandemic, with 72% of Americans in favor, including 62% of Republicans and 87% of Democrats. A March 2021 poll by Monmouth University Polling Institute, conducted as a minimum-wage increase was being considered in Congress, found 53% of respondents supporting an increase to $15 an hour and 45% opposed.

In 2019, 1.6 million Americans earned no more than the federal minimum wage—about 1% of workers, and less than 2% of those paid by the hour. Less than half worked full time; almost half were aged 16–25; and more than 60% worked in the leisure and hospitality industries, where many workers received tips in addition to their hourly wages. No significant differences existed among ethnic or racial groups; women were about twice as likely as men to earn minimum wage or less. In May 2022, the legislature of Hawaii passed a bill to raise the minimum wage to $18 by 2028, the highest state minimum wage in the United States. Governor David Ige signed the bill the next month.

History 

Minimum wage legislation emerged at the end of the nineteenth century from the desire to end sweated labor which had developed in the wake of industrialization. Sweatshops employed large numbers of women and young workers, paying them what were considered nonliving wages that did not allow workers to afford the necessaries of life. Besides substandard wages, sweating was also associated with long work hours and unsanitary and unsafe work conditions. From the 1890s to the 1920s, during the Progressive Era, a time of social activists and political reform across the United States, progressive reformers, women's organizations, religious figures, academics, and politicians all played an important role in getting state minimum wage laws passed throughout the United States.

The first successful attempts at using minimum wage laws to ameliorate the problem of nonliving wages occurred in the Australian state of Victoria in 1896. Factory inspector reports and newspaper reporting on the conditions of sweated labor in Melbourne, Victoria led in 1895 to the formation of the National Anti-Sweating League which pushed the government aggressively to deal legislatively with the problem of substandard wages. The government, following the recommendation of the Victorian Chief Secretary Alexander Peacock, established wage boards which were tasked with establishing minimum wages in the labor trades which suffered from unlivable wages. During the same time period, campaigns against sweated labor were occurring in the United States and England.

In the United States, the earliest minimum wage laws were state laws focused on women and children. These laws were struck down by the Supreme Court between 1923 and 1937. The first federal minimum wage law, which exempted large parts of the workforce, was enacted in 1938 and set rates that became obsolete during World War II.

Progressive Era 

As in Australia, civic concern for sweated labor developed in the United States towards the end of the Gilded Age. In New York state in 1890, a group of female reformers who were worried about the harsh conditions of sweated labor in the country formed the Consumer's League of the City of New York. The consumer group sought to improve working conditions by boycotting products which were made under sweated conditions and did not conform to a code of "fair house" standards drawn up by them. Similar, consumer leagues formed throughout the United States, and in 1899, they united under the National Consumer League (NCL) parent organization. Consumer advocacy, however, was extremely slow at changing conditions in the sweated industries. When NCL leaders in 1908 went to an international anti-sweatshop conference in Geneva, Switzerland and were introduced to Australian minimum wage legislation, which had successfully dealt with sweated labor, they came home believers and made minimum wage legislation part of their national platform. 
In 1910, in conjunction with advocacy work led by Florence Kelley of the National Consumer League, the Women's Trade Union League (WTLU) of Massachusetts under the leadership of Elizabeth Evans took up the cause of minimum wage legislation in Massachusetts. Over the next two years, a coalition of social reform groups and labor advocates in Boston pushed for minimum wage legislation in the state. On June 4, 1912, Massachusetts passed the first minimum wage legislation in the United States, which established a state commission for recommending non-compulsory minimum wages for women and children. The passage of the bill was significantly assisted by the Lawrence textile strike which had raged for ten weeks at the beginning of 1912. The strike brought national attention to the plight of the low wage textile workers, and pushed the state legislatures, who feared the magnitude of the strike, to enact progressive labor legislation.

By 1923, fifteen U.S. states and the District of Columbia had passed minimum wage laws, with pressure being placed on state legislatures by the National Consumers League in a coalition with other women's voluntary associations and organized labor. The United States Supreme Court of the Lochner era (1897–1937), however, consistently invalidated labor regulation laws. Advocates for state minimum wage laws hoped that they would be upheld under the precedent of Muller v. Oregon (1908), which upheld maximum working hours laws for women on the grounds that women required special protection that men did not. The Supreme Court, however, did not extend this principle to minimum wage laws. The court ruled in Adkins v. Children's Hospital (1923) that the District of Columbia's minimum wage law was unconstitutional, because the law interfered with the ability of employers to freely negotiate wage contracts with employees. The court also noted that women did not require any more special protection by the law, following the passage in 1920 of the Nineteenth Amendment, which gave women the right to vote and equal legal status.

However, at the same time, in the United States, the late 19th century ideas for favoring a minimum wage (rather than wage subsidies) coincided with the eugenics movement. As a consequence, many prominent Progressive economists at the time, including Royal Meeker, Henry Rogers Seager, and Edward Cummings, argued for adoption of a minimum wage for the explicit purpose of supporting the "right" sort of semi- and unskilled laborers while forcing the "wrong" sort (including immigrants, racial minorities, women, and the disabled) out of the labor market and, over the longer term, impeding their ability to thrive and have families, or, in the case of women, push them out of the labor pool and back towards the home. The recognized result of a minimum wage, a contraction in a firm's labor force and societal elimination of the "wrong" sort of people, was the specific stated outcome, with a view to applying it across the entirety of the American body politic.

New Deal 

In 1933, the Roosevelt administration during the New Deal made the first attempt at establishing a national minimum wage regiment with the National Industrial Recovery Act, which set minimum wage and maximum hours on an industry and regional basis. The Supreme Court, however, in Schechter Poultry Corp. v. United States (1935) ruled the act unconstitutional, and the minimum wage regulations were abolished. Two years later after President Roosevelt's overwhelming reelection in 1936 and discussion of judicial reform, the Supreme Court took up the issue of labor legislation again in West Coast Hotel Co. v. Parrish (1937) and upheld the constitutionality of minimum wage legislation enacted by Washington state and overturned the Adkins decision which marked the end of the Lochner era. In 1938, the minimum wage was re-established pursuant to the Fair Labor Standards Act, this time at a uniform rate of $0.25 per hour (equivalent to $ in ). The Supreme Court upheld the Fair Labor Standards Act in United States v. Darby Lumber Co. (1941), holding that Congress had the power under the Commerce Clause to regulate employment conditions.

The 1938 minimum wage law only applied to "employees engaged in interstate commerce or in the production of goods for interstate commerce," but in amendments in 1961 and 1966, the federal minimum wage was extended (with slightly different rates) to employees in large retail and service enterprises, local transportation and construction, state and local government employees, as well as other smaller expansions; a grandfather clause in 1990 drew most employees into the purview of federal minimum wage policy, which by then set the wage at $3.80.

Legislation

Federal laws 

The federal minimum wage in the United States has been $7.25 per hour since July 2009, the last time Congress raised it. Some types of labor are exempt: Employers may pay tipped labor a minimum of $2.13 per hour, as long as the hour wage plus tip income equals at least the minimum wage. Persons under the age of 20 may be paid $4.25 an hour for the first 90 calendar days of employment (sometimes known as a youth, teen, or training wage) unless a higher state minimum exists. The 2009 increase was the last of three steps of the Fair Minimum Wage Act of 2007, which increased the wage from $5.15 per hour in 2007 to $7.25 per hour in 2009.

State laws 

The hourly minimum wage numbers link to the state pages.

 

In the United States, different states are able to set their own minimum wages independent of the federal government. When the state and federal minimum wage differ, the higher wage prevails.  there were 29 states with a minimum wage higher than the federal minimum. Washington, D.C. and New York City have the highest minimum wage at $15.00 per hour. The minimum wage in New Jersey is $14.13 an hour as of January 1, 2023, but will be raised a dollar a year until 2024 when it will be $15. Massachusetts's minimum wage is $15.00 per hour. Since 2009, multiple state legislatures have enacted state preemption laws which prohibit local governments from setting their own minimum wage amounts.  state preemption laws for local minimum wages have passed in 25 states.

Legislation has been enacted recently in multiple states that significantly raises the minimum wage. California, Illinois, and Massachusetts are all set to raise their minimum wages to $15.00 per hour by January 1, 2023, for California and Massachusetts and by 2025 for Illinois. Colorado raised its minimum wage from $9.30 per hour to $12 per hour by January 1, 2020, rising $0.90 per year. The New York State Legislature has also enacted legislation to increase its minimum wage to $15.00 per hour over time, with certain counties and larger companies set on faster schedules than others.

Local ordinances 

Some smaller government entities, such as counties and cities, observe minimum wages that are higher than the state as a whole. In 2003, San Francisco, California, and Santa Fe, New Mexico, were the first two cities to introduce local minimum wage ordinances. There has been an increase in county and city level minimum wages. In 2010, only three cities had minimum wages that exceeded state or federal minimum wages, but by 2020, there were 42.

In the current wave of minimum wage legislative action, Seattle, Washington, was the first city to enact on June 2, 2014, a local ordinance to increase the minimum wage for all workers to $15.00 per hour, which phases in over seven years. This ordinance followed the referendum in SeaTac, Washington, in November 2013, which raised on a more limited scale the local minimum wage to $15.00 for transportation and hospitality workers. Numerous other cities have followed Seattle's example since. San Francisco became the first major city in the U.S. to reach a minimum wage of $15.00 per hour on July 1, 2018. New York City's minimum wage will be $15.00 per hour by the end of 2018. The minimum wage in Los Angeles and Washington, D.C., will be $15.00 per hour in 2020. By July 1, 2021, the minimum wage in Chicago had reached $15.00, with Illinois eventually matching the rate statewide by 2025. Similarly, the minimum wage in Minneapolis, Minnesota had reached $15.00 per hour by 2022. A growing number of other California cities have also enacted local minimum wage ordinances to increase the minimum wage to $15.00 per hour or higher, including Berkeley, El Cerrito, Emeryville, Mountain View, Oakland, Richmond, and San Jose.

Puerto Rico 

In contrast, the relatively high minimum wage in Puerto Rico has been blamed by various politicians and commentators as a highly significant factor in the Puerto Rican government-debt crisis. One study concluded that "Employers are disinclined to hire workers because the US federal minimum wage is very high relative to the local average".

However, Law 47 of 2021 (the Puerto Rico Minimum Wage Act) changed paths in Puerto Rico's minimum wage schemes. The law increased the minimum wage from $7.25 to $10.50 per hour (or higher) by 1 July 2024 and created the Minimum Wage Review Commission within the Department of Labor and Human Resources which will review and increase the minimum wage yearly via decrees. If by 1 July 2024, the Minimum Wage Review Commission decides the wage ought to be higher than 10.50, it will decree so. The law also provided  employees of local businesses not covered by the Fair Labor Standards Act of 1938 with protections.

Inflation indexing 

Some politicians in the United States advocate linking the minimum wage to the consumer price index, thereby increasing the wage automatically each year based on increases to the consumer price index. Linking the minimum wage to the consumer price index avoids the erosion of the purchasing power of the minimum wage with time because of inflation. In 1998, the Washington State Legislature approved the first consumer price indexing for its minimum wage in the country. In 2003, San Francisco, California and Santa Fe, New Mexico were the first cities to approve consumer price indexing for their minimum wage. Oregon and Florida were the next states to link their minimum wages to the consumer price index. Later in 2006, voters in six states (Arizona, Colorado, Missouri, Montana, Nevada, and Ohio)  approved statewide increases in the state minimum wage. The amounts of these increases ranged from $1 to $1.70 per hour, and all increases were designed to annually index to inflation. As of 2018, the minimum wage is indexed to inflation in 17 states. Due to the 2021–2022 inflation surge, California seeks to increase the minimum wage from $15.00/hour to $18.00/hour even though California's unemployment rate is twice the national average.

Union exemptions 

Some minimum wage ordinances have an exemption for unionized workers. For instance, the Los Angeles City Council approved a minimum salary in 2014 for hotel workers of $15.37 per hour which has such an exemption. This led in some cases to longtime workers at unionized hotels such as the Sheraton Universal making $10.00 per hour, whereas non-union employees at a non-union Hilton less than 500 feet away making at least $15.37 as mandated by law for non-unionized employees.  Similar exemptions have been adopted in other cities. As of December 2014, unions were exempt from minimum wage ordinances in Chicago, Illinois, SeaTac, Washington, and Milwaukee County, Wisconsin, as well as the California cities of Los Angeles, San Francisco, Long Beach, San Jose, Richmond, and Oakland. In 2016, the District of Columbia Council enacted a minimum wage ordinance that included a union waiver, but Mayor Vincent Gray vetoed it. Later that year, the council approved an increase without the union waiver.

Historical trend 

The federal minimum wage was introduced in 1938 at the rate of $0.25 per hour (equivalent to $5.19 in 2022). By 1950 the minimum wage had risen to $0.75 per hour. The purchasing power of the federal minimum wage has fluctuated; it was highest in February 1968, when it was $1.60 per hour. The real value of the federal minimum wage in 2022 dollars has decreased by 46% since its inflation-adjusted peak in February 1968. The minimum wage would be $13.46 in 2022 dollars if its real value had remained at the 1968 level. See chart to right. From January 1981 to April 1990, the minimum wage was frozen at $3.35 per hour, then a record-setting minimum wage freeze. From September 1, 1997, through July 23, 2007, the federal minimum wage remained constant at $5.15 per hour, breaking the old record. On July 24, 2008, the minimum wage was adjusted to $6.55, and then to $7.25 on July 24, 2009 where it has remained fixed for the past thirteen years.

Economic effects 

The economic effects of raising the minimum wage are unclear. Adjusting the minimum wage may affect current and future levels of employment, prices of goods and services, economic growth, income inequality, and poverty. The interconnection of price levels, central bank policy, wage agreements, and total aggregate demand creates a situation in which conclusions drawn from macroeconomic analysis are highly influenced by the underlying assumptions of the interpreter.

Employment 

In neoclassical economics, the law of demand states that—all else being equal—raising the price of any particular good or service reduces the quantity demanded. Therefore, neoclassical economists argue that—all else being equal—raising the minimum wage will have adverse effects on employment. Conceptually, if an employer does not believe a worker generates value equal to or in excess of the minimum wage, they do not hire or retain that worker.

Other economists of different schools of thought argue that a limited increase in the minimum wage does not affect or increases the number of jobs available. Economist David Cooper for instance estimates that a higher minimum wage would support the creation of at least 85,000 new jobs in the United States. This divergence of thought began with empirical work on fast food workers in the 1990s which challenged the neoclassical model. In 1994, economists David Card and Alan Krueger studied employment trends among 410 restaurants in New Jersey and eastern Pennsylvania following New Jersey's minimum wage hike (from $4.25 to $5.05) in April 1992. They found "no indication that the rise in the minimum wage reduced employment." Similarly, a Morgan Study concluded that a national $15 minimum wage would have minimal to no positive or negative effect on employment levels. In contrast, a 1995 analysis of the evidence by David Neumark found that the increase in New Jersey's minimum wage resulted in a 4.6% decrease in employment. Neumark's study relied on payroll records from a sample of large fast-food restaurant chains, whereas the Card-Krueger study relied on business surveys.

A literature review conducted by David Neumark and William Wascher in 2007 (which surveyed 101 studies related to the employment effects of minimum wages) found that about two-thirds of peer-reviewed economic research showed a positive correlation between minimum wage hikes and increased unemployment—especially for young and unskilled workers. Neumark's review further found that, when looking at only the most credible research, 85% of studies showed a positive correlation between minimum wage hikes and increased unemployment.

Statistical meta-analysis conducted by Tom Stanley in 2005 in contrast found that there is evidence of publication bias in minimum wage literature, and that correction of this bias shows no relationship between the minimum wage and unemployment. In 2008 Hristos Doucouliagos and Tom Stanley conducted a similar meta-analysis of 64 U.S. studies on disemployment effects and concluded that Card and Krueger's initial claim of publication bias was correct. Moreover, they concluded, "Once this publication selection is corrected, little or no evidence of a negative association between minimum wages and employment remains."

A 2012 study led by Joseph Sabia estimated that the 2004-6 New York State minimum wage increase (from $5.15 to $6.75) resulted in a 20.2% to 21.8% reduction in employment for less-skilled, less-educated workers. Similarly, a study led by Richard Burkhauser in 2000 concluded that minimum wage increases "significantly reduce the employment of the most vulnerable groups in the working-age population—young adults without a high school degree (aged 20-24), young black adults and teenagers (aged 16-24), and teenagers (aged 16-19)."

The Economist wrote in December 2013 in sum that: "A minimum wage, providing it is not set too high, could thus boost pay with no ill effects on jobs...Some studies find no harm to employment from federal or state minimum wages, others see a small one, but none finds any serious damage...High minimum wages, however, particularly in rigid labour markets, do appear to hit employment. France has the rich world's highest wage floor, at more than 60% of the median for adults and a far bigger fraction of the typical wage for the young. This helps explain why France also has shockingly high rates of youth unemployment: 26% for 15- to 24-year-olds."

In 2014 the state with the highest minimum wage in the nation, Washington, exceeded the national average for job growth in the United States. Washington had a job growth rate 0.3% faster than the national average job growth rate.

A 2018 University of Washington study which investigated the effects of Seattle's minimum wage increases (from $9.50 to $11 in 2015 and then to $13 in 2016) found that while the second wage increase caused hourly wages to grow by 3%, it also caused employers to cut employee hours by 6%, yielding an average decrease of $74 earned per month per job in 2016. In a follow-up study, the researchers found that workers already employed at the time of the wage increase and with above-median experience saw their earnings go up by an average of $8–$12 per week, (with one-quarter of the earnings gains attributed to experienced workers making up for lost hours in Seattle with work outside the city limits) while the earnings of less-experienced workers saw no significant change. Additionally, the study associated the minimum wage increase with an 8% reduction in employee turnover, and a significant reduction of new workers joining the workforce.

A 2019 study in the Quarterly Journal of Economics on state changes in minimum wage levels between 1979 and 2016 had no impact on the overall number of low-wage jobs. A 2021 study on the effects in the late 1960s and early 1970s of the 1966 extension of the Fair Labor Standards Act, which extended the minimum wage to cover several economic sectors where nearly a third of all black workers were employed, found that the new minimum wages led to a sharp increase in earnings for the newly covered workers without any adverse aggregate effects on employment and also substantially reduced the racial wage gap.

One reason why the minimum wage may increase employment or have no impact on employment is that if monopsony power is present within a labour market.

Congressional Budget Office's estimates of federal minimum wage increases 

The Congressional Budget Office (CBO) in 2014 estimated the theoretical effects of a federal minimum wage increase under two scenarios: an increase to $9.00 and an increase to $10.10. According to the report, approximately 100,000 jobs would be lost under the $9.00 option, whereas 500,000 jobs would be lost under the $10.10 option (with a wide range of possible outcomes).

The CBO in 2019 estimated the theoretical effects of a federal minimum wage increase under three scenarios: increases per hour to $10, $12 and $15 by 2025. Under the $15 scenario, in 2025 up to 27 million workers could see increases to their average weekly earnings while 3.7 million workers could lose employment.  The latter statistic, in CBO's estimation would rise over time in any wage increase scenario as capital allocation replaces some workers.  Wage increases would be heavily skewed (40%) towards those already earning above the minimum wage with more than 80% of benefits accruing to more educated workers living above the poverty line (Table 5).  The number of persons in poverty would be reduced by 1.3 million (assuming no tax implications from increased income).  The CBO notes that it does not consider the inflationary effects of these policies when estimating the change in poverty level as these estimates, while increasing inflation, are uncertain.  Additionally, the CBO assumed that the weight of benefits would accrue to those below the poverty level based on historical wage increase levels. They noted that data on the minimum wage tends to assume the opposite (that benefits accrue to those above the poverty level), but that that data was not definitive enough to allow for estimation in their work.  Some aspects of the CBO study are summarized in the table below.

Prices 

Conceptually, raising the minimum wage increases the cost of labor, with all other things being equal. Thus, employers may accept some combination of lower profits, higher prices, or increased automation. If prices increase, consumers may demand a lesser quantity of the product, substitute other products, or switch to imported products, due to the effects of price elasticity of demand. Marginal producers (those who are barely profitable enough to survive) may be forced out of business if they cannot raise their prices sufficiently to offset the higher cost of labor. Federal Reserve Bank of Chicago research from 2007 has shown that restaurant prices rise in response to minimum wage increases. However, there are studies that show that higher prices for products due to increased labor cost are usually only by about 0.4% of the original price.

According to a 2020 study, a 10% minimum wage increase for grocery store workers translates into 0.36% higher grocery prices which is consistent with full cost pass-through. Similarly, a 2021 study which covered 10,000 McDonald's restaurants in the US found that between 2016 and 2020, the cost of 10% minimum wage increases for McDonald's workers were passed through to customers as 1.4% increases in the price of a Big Mac. This results in minimum wage workers getting a lesser increase in their "real wage" than in their nominal wage, because any goods and services they purchase made with minimum-wage labor have now increased in cost, analogous to an increase in the sales tax.

Effect on suicides 

Researchers found in 2019 that, "Between 1990 and 2015, raising the minimum wage by $1 in each state might have saved more than 27,000 lives, according to a report published this week in the Journal of Epidemiology & Community Health. An increase of $2 in each state's minimum wage could have prevented more than 57,000 suicides." The researchers stated, "The effect of a US$1 increase in the minimum wage ranged from a 3.4% decrease (95% CI 0.4 to 6.4) to a 5.9% decrease (95% CI 1.4 to 10.2) in the suicide rate among adults aged 18–64 years with a high school education or less. We detected significant effect modification by unemployment rate, with the largest effects of minimum wage on reducing suicides observed at higher unemployment levels." They concluded, "Minimum wage increases appear to reduce the suicide rate among those with a high school education or less, and may reduce disparities between socioeconomic groups. Effects appear greatest during periods of high unemployment."

Effects on crime 

A 2016 White House report  argued that higher hourly wages led to less crime. The study by the Council of Economic Advisers calculated that "raising the minimum wage reduces crime by 3 to 5 percent." To get those numbers, the study assumed that "such a minimum wage increase would have no employment impacts, with an employment elasticity of 0.1 the benefits would be somewhat lower."

In contrast in a 1987 journal article, Masanori Hashimoto noted that minimum wage hikes lead to increased levels of property crime in areas affected by the minimum wage after its increase. According to the article, by decreasing employment in poor communities, total legal trade and production are curtailed. The report also argued that to compensate for the decrease in legal avenues for production and consumption, poor communities increasingly turn to illegal trade and activity.

Economic growth 

Whether growth (GDP, a measure of both income and production) increases or decreases depends significantly on whether the income shifted from owners to workers results in an overall higher level of spending. The tendency of a consumer to spend their next dollar is referred to as the marginal propensity to consume or MPC. The transfer of income from higher income owners (who tend to save more, meaning a lower MPC) to lower income workers (who tend to save less, with a higher MPC) can actually lead to an increase in total consumption and higher demand for goods, leading to increased employment.

The CBO reported in February 2014 that income (GDP) overall would be marginally higher after raising the minimum wage, indicating a small net positive increase in growth. Raising the minimum wage to $10.10 and indexing it to inflation would result in a net $2 billion increase in income during the second half of 2016, while raising it to $9.00 and not indexing it would result in a net $1 billion increase in income.

Additionally, a study by Overstreet in 2019 examined increases to the minimum wage in Arizona. Utilizing data spanning from 1976 to 2017, Overstreet found that a 1% increase in the minimum wage was significantly correlated with a 1.13% increase in per capita income in Arizona. This study could show that smaller increases in minimum wage may not distort labor market as significantly as larger increases experienced in other cities and states. Thus, the small increases experienced in Arizona may have actually led to a slight increase in economic growth.

Income inequality 

An increase in the minimum wage is a form of redistribution from higher-income persons (business owners or "capital") to lower income persons (workers or "labor") and therefore should reduce income inequality. The CBO estimated in February 2014 that raising the minimum wage under either scenario described above would improve income inequality. Families with income more than 6 times the poverty threshold would see their incomes fall (due in part to their business profits declining with higher employee costs), while families with incomes below that threshold would rise. Writing in The Atlantic, journalist Derek Thompson summarized several studies which indicate that both state-level minimum wage increases and tighter labor markets caused wages to grow faster for lower income workers than higher income workers during the 2018–2019 time period.

Poverty 

Among hourly-paid workers in 2016, 701,000 earned the federal minimum wage and about 1.5 million earned wages below the minimum. Together, these 2.2 million workers represented 2.7% of all hourly-paid workers.

The CBO estimated in February 2014 that raising the minimum wage would reduce the number of persons below the poverty income threshold by 900,000 under the $10.10 option versus 300,000 under the $9.00 option. Similarly, Arindrajit Dube, professor of economics at University of Massachusetts Amherst, found in a 2017 study "robust evidence that higher minimum wages lead to increases in incomes among families at the bottom of the income distribution and that these wages reduce the poverty rate." According to the study "a 10 percent increase in the minimum wage reduces the nonelderly poverty rate by about 5 percent." Similarly, a Morgan Study concluded that a national $15 minimum wage would lift tens of millions of Americans, potentially 32 million Americans, out of poverty, and would also improve  racial wage gaps.

In contrast, research conducted by David Neumark and colleagues in 2004 found that minimum wages are associated with reductions in the hours and employment of low-wage workers. A separate study by the same researchers found that minimum wages tend to increase the proportion of families with incomes below or near the poverty line. Similarly, a 2002 study led by Richard Vedder, professor of economics at Ohio University, concluded that "The empirical evidence is strong that minimum wages have had little or no effect on poverty in the U.S. Indeed, the evidence is stronger that minimum wages occasionally increase poverty…"

According to some economists, minimum wage increases result in a variety of negative effects for lower-skilled workers including reduced employment, reduced hours, reduced benefits, and less safe working conditions.

Federal budget deficit 

In 2021, the Congressional Budget Office released a report which estimated that incrementally raising the federal minimum wage to $15 an hour by 2025 would increase the federal budget deficit by $54 billion over ten years by increasing the cost of goods and services paid for by the federal government.

Commentary

Economists 

According to a survey conducted by economist Greg Mankiw, 79% of economists agreed that "a minimum wage increases unemployment among young and unskilled workers."

A 2015 survey conducted by the University of New Hampshire Survey Center found that a majority of economists believes raising the minimum wage to $15 per hour would have negative effects on youth employment levels (83%), adult employment levels (52%), and the number of jobs available (76%). Additionally, 67% of economists surveyed believed that a $15 minimum wage would make it harder for small businesses with less than 50 employees to stay in business.

A 2006 survey conducted by economist Robert Whaples of a sample of 210 Ph.D. economists randomly selected from the American Economic Association, found that, regarding the U.S. minimum wage:
 46.8% favored eliminating it
 1.3% favored decreasing it
 14.3% favored keeping it the same
 5.2% favored increasing it by about 50 cents per hour
 15.6% favored increasing it by about $1 per hour
 16.9% favored increasing it by more than $1 per hour

In 2014, over 600 economists signed a letter in support of increasing the minimum wage to $10.10 with research suggesting that a minimum wage increase could have a small stimulative effect on the economy as low-wage workers spend their additional earnings, raising demand and job growth.  Also, seven recipients of the Nobel Prize in Economic Sciences were among 75 economists endorsing an increase in the minimum wage for U.S. workers and said "the weight" of economic research shows higher pay does not lead to fewer jobs.

According to a February 2013 survey of the University of Chicago IGM Forum, which includes approximately 40 economists:
 34% agreed with the statement that "Raising the federal minimum wage to $9 per hour would make it noticeably harder for low-skilled workers to find employment", with 32% disagreeing and 24% uncertain
 42% agreed that "...raising the minimum wage to $9 per hour and indexing it to inflation...would be a desirable policy", with 11% disagreeing or strongly disagreeing and 32% uncertain.

According to a fall 2000 survey conducted by Fuller and Geide-Stevenson, 73.5% (27.9% of which agreed with provisos) of American economists surveyed[How many?] agreed that minimum wage laws increase unemployment among unskilled and young workers, while 26.5% disagreed with the statement.

Economist Paul Krugman advocated raising the minimum wage moderately in 2013, citing several reasons, including:
 The minimum wage was below its 1960s purchasing power, despite a near doubling of productivity;
 The great preponderance of the evidence indicates there is no negative impact on employment from moderate increases; and
 A high level of public support, specifically Democrats and Republican women.

American economist, novelist, and senior fellow at Stanford University's Hoover Institution Thomas Sowell has criticized minimum wage laws. In his book Basic Economics, he stated that "Unfortunately, the real minimum wage is always zero, regardless of the laws, and that is the wage that many workers receive in the wake of the creation or escalation of a government-mandated minimum wage, because they lose their jobs or fail to find jobs when they enter the labor force. Making it illegal to pay less than a given amount does not make a worker's productivity worth that amount—and, if it is not, that worker is unlikely to be employed."

Major political parties 

Democratic candidates, elected officials, and activists support an increase in the minimum wage. In his 2013 State of the Union Address, President Barack Obama called for an increase in the federal minimum wage to $9 an hour; several months later, Democrats Tom Harkin and George Miller proposed legislation to increase the federal minimum wage to $10.10; and in 2015, congressional Democrats introduced a proposal to increase the federal minimum wage to $12 an hour. These efforts did not succeed, but increases in city and state minimum wages prompted congressional Democrats to continue fighting for an increase on the federal level. After much internal party debate, the party's official platform adopted at the 2016 Democratic National Convention stated: "We should raise the federal minimum wage to $15 an hour over time and index it, give all Americans the ability to join a union regardless of where they work, and create new ways for workers to have power in the economy so every worker can earn at least $15 an hour."

Most Republican elected officials oppose action to increase the minimum wage, and have blocked Democratic efforts to increase the minimum wage. Republican leadership such as Speakers of the House John Boehner and Paul Ryan have opposed minimum wage increases. Some Republicans oppose having a minimum wage altogether, while a few, conversely, have supported minimum wage increases or indexing the minimum wage to inflation.

In January 2014, seven Nobel economists—Kenneth Arrow, Peter Diamond, Eric Maskin, Thomas Schelling, Robert Solow, Michael Spence, and Joseph Stiglitz—and 600 other economists wrote a letter to the US Congress and the US President urging that, by 2016, the US government should raise the minimum wage to $10.10. They endorsed the Minimum Wage Fairness Act which was introduced by US Senator Tom Harkin in 2013.  U.S. Senator Bernie Sanders introduced a bill in 2015 that would raise the minimum wage to $15, and in his 2016 campaign for president ran on a platform of increasing it. Although Sanders did not become the nominee, the Democratic National Committee adopted his $15 minimum wage push in their 2016 party platform.

Protests for increasing the wage 

Since 2012, a growing protest and advocacy movement called "Fight for $15", initially growing out of fast food worker strikes, has advocated for an increase in the minimum wage to a living wage. Since the start of these protests, a number of states and cities have increased their minimum wage. In 2014, Connecticut for instance passed legislation to raise the minimum wage from $8.70 to $10.10 per hour by 2017, making it one of about six states at the time to aim at or above $10.00 per hour. In 2014 and 2015, several cities, including San Francisco, Seattle, Los Angeles, and Washington D.C. passed ordinances that gradually increase the minimum wage to $15.00 per hour. In 2016 New York and California became the first states to pass legislation that would gradually raise the minimum wage to $15 per hour in each state, followed by Massachusetts in 2018.

In April 2014, the U.S. Senate debated the minimum wage on the federal level by way of the Minimum Wage Fairness Act. The bill would have amended the Fair Labor Standards Act of 1938 (FLSA) to increase the federal minimum wage for employees to $10.10 per hour over the course of a two-year period. The bill was strongly supported by President Barack Obama and many of the Democratic Senators, but strongly opposed by Republicans in the Senate and House. Later in 2014, voters in the Republican-controlled states of Alaska, Arkansas, Nebraska and South Dakota considered ballot initiatives to raise the minimum wage above the national rate of $7.25 per hour, which were successful in all four states. The results provided evidence that raising minimum wage has support across party lines.

In April 2017, Senator Bernie Sanders and Senator Patty Murray, backed by 28 of the Senate's Democrats, introduced new federal legislation which would raise the minimum wage to $15 per hour by 2024 and index it to inflation. The Raise the Wage Act of 2017, which was simultaneously introduced in the House of Representatives with 166 Democratic cosponsors, would raise the minimum wage to $9.25 per hour immediately, and then gradually increase it to $15 per hour by 2024, while simultaneously raising the minimum wage for tipped workers and phasing it out. The legislation was introduced according to Senator Bernie Sanders to make sure that every worker has at least a modest and decent standard of living.

Reactions from former McDonald's USA Ed Rensi about raising minimum wage to $15 is to completely push humans out of the picture when it comes to labor; if they are to pay minimum wage at $15 they would look into replacing humans with machines as that would be the more cost-effective than having employees that are ineffective. During an interview on FOX Business Network's Mornings with Maria, he stated that he believes an increase to $15 an hour would cause job loss at an extraordinary level. Rensi also believes it does not only affect the fast food industry; franchising he sees as the best business model in the United States, as it is dependent on people that have low job skills that have to grow and if you cannot pay them a reasonable wage then they are going to be replaced with machines.

Following protests due to low wages and poor work conditions, Amazon raised the minimum wage for all its employees to $15.00 per hour in October 2018. The company subsequently became a major lobbyist for a $15.00 per hour minimum wage, which some observed as a way for the company to force competitors to increase their worker costs as well.

Polls 

The Pew Center reported in January 2014 that 73% of Americans supported raising the minimum wage from $7.25 to $10. By party, 53% of Republicans and 90% of Democrats favored this action. Pew found a racial difference for support of a higher minimum wage in 2017 with most blacks and Hispanics supporting a $15.00 federal minimum wage, and 54% of whites opposing it.

A Lake Research Partners poll in February 2012 found the following:
 Strong support overall for raising the minimum wage, with 73% of likely voters supporting an increase to $10 and indexing it to inflation during 2014, including 58% who strongly support the action;
 Support crosses party lines, with support from 91% of Democrats, 74% of Independents, and 50% of Republicans; and
 A majority (56%) believe that raising the minimum wage will help the economy, 16% believe it won't make a difference, and only 21% felt it would hurt the economy.
Regardless of the ruling, the idea of raising the minimum wage to $15 by 2025 from its current $7.25 is broadly popular, a Reuters/Ipsos poll found. Some 59% of respondents said they supported the idea, with 34% opposing it.
When told that "raising the minimum wage should lift some families out of poverty, but government economists also expect it could eliminate some low income jobs, potentially making some families worse off," 55% of respondents said they supported it.
About 40% of American adults said that they would benefit – either personally or through a member of their family – if the U.S. raised the federal minimum wage.

List by jurisdiction 

This is a list of the minimum wages (per hour) in each state and territory of the United States, for jobs covered by federal minimum wage laws. If the job is not subject to the federal Fair Labor Standards Act, then state, city, or other local laws may determine the minimum wage.  A common exemption to the federal minimum wage is a company having revenue of less than $500,000 per year while not engaging in any interstate commerce.

Under the federal law, workers who receive a portion of their salary from tips, such as waitstaff, are required only to have their total compensation, including tips, meet the minimum wage. Therefore, often, their hourly wage, before tips, is less than the minimum wage. Seven states, and Guam, do not allow for a tip credit. Additional exemptions to the minimum wage include many seasonal employees, student employees, and certain disabled employees as specified by the FLSA. Some American corporations pay their disabled employees subminimum wages as low as $1 per hour, with these laborers rarely moving on to higher-paying jobs. At least 14 state governments have banned this practice because of its discriminatory and exploitative nature.

In addition, some counties and cities within states may implement a higher minimum wage than the rest of their state. Sometimes this higher wage applies only to businesses that contract with the local government, while in other cases the higher minimum applies to all work.

Federal

State 

As of October 2016, there have been 29 states with a minimum wage higher than the federal minimum. From 2014 to 2015, nine states increased their minimum wage levels through automatic adjustments, while increases in 11 other states occurred through referendum or legislative action.
Beginning on July 1, 2021,  Washington D.C has the highest minimum wages in the country, at $15.20 per hour. New York City's minimum wage for companies with 11 or more employees became $15.00 per hour on December 31, 2018.  On the same day, NYC's hourly minimum wage for companies with 10 or fewer employees became $13.50. The minimum wage in Illinois will reach $15 per hour by 2025 with increases beginning in 2020.

In the state of Alaska, California, Minnesota, Montana, Nevada, Oregon, Washington, same minimum wage are applied for both tipped and non-tipped employees. Tips collected by employees in these states will not offset employer's obligation to pay the wage, and tips is the additional income beyond the wage paid by employer.

Federal district

Territory

Large companies 

Some large employers in the traditionally low-paying retail sector have declared an internal minimum wage. As of 2020:
 Amazon.com – $15/hour
 Bank of America – $17/hour
 Ben & Jerry's – $16.92/hour
 Charter Communications/Spectrum – $15/hour
 Costco – $15/hour
 Facebook – $15–20/hour depending on location
 Huntington National Bank – $16/hour
 JPMorgan Chase – $15–18/hour depending on location
 Target – $15/hour
 Walmart – $11/hour
 Wells Fargo – $15/hour

Low-paying occupations: 2006 and 2009 

Jobs that a minimum wage is most likely to directly affect are those that pay close to the minimum.

According to the May 2006 National Occupational Employment and Wage Estimates, the four lowest-paid occupational sectors in May 2006 (when the federal minimum wage was $5.15 per hour) were the following:

Two years later, in May 2008, when the federal minimum wage was $5.85 per hour and was about to increase to $6.55 per hour in July, these same sectors were still the lowest-paying, but their situation (according to Bureau of Labor Statistics data) was:

In 2006, workers in the following 13 individual occupations received a median hourly wage of less than $8.00 per hour:

In 2008, two occupations paid a median wage less than $8.00 per hour:

According to the May 2009 National Occupational Employment and Wage Estimates, the lowest-paid occupational sectors in May 2009 (when the federal minimum wage was $7.25 per hour) were the following:

See also 

 List of US states by minimum wage
 List of countries by minimum wage
 Average worker's wage
 Fair Labor Standards Act of 1938
 History of labor law in the United States
 Income inequality in the United States
 Living wage
 Maximum wage
 Minimum Wage Fixing Convention 1970
 Minimum wage law
 Price/wage spiral
 United States labor law
 Wage slavery
 Wage theft
 Working poor
 List of countries by wealth per adult

Explanatory notes

References

Further reading 
 
 Print edition:

External links 
 
 Federal Minimum Wage. United States Department of Labor Wage and Hour Division.
 Minimum Wages for Tipped Employees. United States Department of Labor Wage and Hour Division.
 Inflation Adjusted Minimum Wage by Year. Compares minimum wage adjusted for inflation by year.
 History of Federal Minimum Wage United States Department of Labor Wage and Hour Division.
 Maps and charts of minimum wage vs. housing costs – National Low Income Housing Coalition (advocacy group).

United States
United States labor law
Poverty in the United States